Julian Francis Abele (April 30, 1881April 23, 1950) was a prominent Black American architect, and chief designer in the offices of Horace Trumbauer. He contributed to the design of more than 400 buildings, including the Widener Memorial Library at Harvard University (1912–15), Philadelphia's 
Central Library (1917–27), and the Philadelphia Museum of Art (1914–28). He was the primary designer of the west campus of Duke University (1924–54).

Abele's contributions to the Trumbauer firm were great, but the only building for which he claimed authorship during Trumbauer's lifetime was Duke University Chapel. Following Trumbauer's 1938 death, he co-headed the architectural firm and designed additional buildings at Duke, including Allen Administrative Building and Cameron Indoor Stadium.

Background 
Abele was born in Philadelphia into a prominent family. His maternal grandfather was Robert Jones, who in the late 18th century founded the city's Lombard Street Central Presbyterian Church. He was also related to Absalom Jones, who established the African Episcopal Church of St. Thomas in 1794, the first Black church in Philadelphia. Abele's son, Julian Francis Abele, Jr. was an architectural engineer and his nephew, Julian Abele Cook, worked as the Building Coordinator for Howard University.

Abele worked in many media: watercolor, lithography, etching and pencil, wood, iron, gold and silver. He designed and constructed all of his own furniture, even doing the petit point himself. While he knew many historic styles, he seemed to love Louis XIV French most of all.

Education

Abele attended the Quaker-run Institute for Colored Youth, which later became Cheyney University, where he excelled in mathematics and was chosen to deliver the commencement address. In 1898, he completed a two-year architectural drawing course at the Pennsylvania Museum School of Industrial Art (PMSIA, now University of the Arts).

He was the first Black student admitted to the Department of Architecture at the University of Pennsylvania.  This achievement was all the more noteworthy for the restrictions Black people faced at the university, including not being able to live in dormitories or dine in the school's cafeteria. On projects assigned to pairs of students, he partnered with Louis Magaziner, the only Jewish student in the department, who also faced discrimination. This was the beginning of a lifelong friendship between the two.

He won a 1901 student competition to design a Beaux Arts pedestrian gateway. His submission was in the form of an exedra – a curved bench flanked by piers, but with steps passing through its center. This became his first commission when it was built on the campus of Haverford College. The Edward B. Conklin Memorial Gate stands at the Railroad Avenue entrance to the college. He was widely respected among his peers, earning the nickname "Willing and Able", and also won student awards for his designs for a post office and a museum of botany, and he was elected as the president of the university's Architectural Society.

He became the University of Pennsylvania architecture department's first Black graduate in 1902. He worked part-time for a local architect and attend evening classes at the Pennsylvania Academy of the Fine Arts. Under the financial sponsorship of Philadelphia architect Horace Trumbauer, he traveled through France and Italy, an experience that was to influence his design work throughout his life.

École des Beaux-Arts
Between 1903 and his hiring by Horace Trumbauer in 1906, Abele traveled throughout Europe. His descendants contend that he studied at the École des Beaux-Arts in Paris during his stay. But Sandra L. Tatman, co-author of The Biographical Dictionary of Philadelphia Architects, 1700-1930, could find no record of his having been enrolled at the École. She allows that he may have been permitted to informally sit in on the school's atelier. She also notes that Abele listed travel to France, Italy, England, Germany, Switzerland, and Spain on his membership application to the American Institute of Architects (AIA), but not study at the École des Beaux-Arts.

Career

Immediately after his graduation from the University of Pennsylvania in 1902, Abele traveled west to Spokane, Washington, where he designed a house for his sister, Elizabeth Abele Cook, before returning east. In 1906, Abele joined the Trumbauer firm as assistant to chief designer Frank Seeburger. When Seeburger left the firm in 1909, Abele advanced to chief designer. Abele's stature within the firm was no secret; he was the second-highest paid employee. He was an architect.

Art historian David B. Brownlee studied the 14-year effort to design and build the Philadelphia Museum of Art, 1914-28. He credits Trumbauer architect Howell Lewis Shay with the building's plan and massing, but notes that the final perspective drawings are in Abele's distinctive hand. Design of the exterior terracing, including the front steps celebrated in the 1976 film Rocky, is credited to Abele.

Following Trumbauer's death in 1938, the firm continued until 1950 under the name "Office of Horace Trumbauer," co-headed by Abele and William O. Frank. Commissions were hard to come by during The Depression and World War II, but the firm completed Duke Indoor Stadium at Duke University in 1940, which was renamed Cameron Indoor Stadium in 1972, and later made additions to Duke's Library (1948) and designed Duke's Allen Administrative Building (1954).

When Abele joined the American Institute of Architects in 1942, Philadelphia Museum of Art director Fiske Kimball called him "one of the most sensitive designers in America". Smithsonian Magazine described him, in a career retrospective, as "probably the most accomplished [Black architect] of his era."

Despite being the primary designer of Duke University, Abele was refused accommodations at a Durham hotel during a visit to campus.  Although it was not until 1988 that a portrait of him was displayed at the University, the main quad at Duke University is now officially named Abele Quad with a dedication plaque prominently placed at the busiest spot on campus.

Personal
In 1925, at the age of 44, he married Marguerite Bulle, a French pianist 20 years his junior. They had three children: Julian Abele, Jr., Marguerite Marie Abele (died young), and Nadia Boulanger Abele.  Marguerite left him in 1936, to become the common-law wife of opera singer Jozef Kowalewski, with whom she had three additional children. Because Abele never took action to divorce his wife, the Kowalewski children shared in his estate.

He died from a heart attack in 1950, in Philadelphia and is interred at Eden Cemetery in Collingdale, Pennsylvania.

Legacy
The Allen Administration Building at Duke University, which he designed, was completed after his death in 1950. 
In 1988 Duke University honored Abele with his portrait that is displayed in the main lobby of the Allen Building. It was the first portrait of an African-American to be displayed on the campus.  To prominently acknowledge his contribution to Duke University's West Campus, the main quad at Duke is now officially named Abele Quad with a dedication plaque prominently placed at the very center of west campus.
On August 17, 2012, construction began on Julian Abele Park, at 22nd & Carpenter Streets in Philadelphia.	
Architectural historian Dreck Spurlock Wilson is preparing the first biography of Abele.

Gallery

See also
 List of Cheyney University of Pennsylvania alumni

References

Further reading
 Doyle, Rachel B., "Meet the black architect who designed Duke University 37 years before he could have attended it",Curbed, December 6, 2017
 Magaziner, Henry J., As I Remember Julian Abele, (unpublished typescript, biography file, Athenaeum of Philadelphia). The author was the son of Abele's friend Louis Magaziner.
 Maher, James T., The Twilight of Splendor; Chronicles of the Age of American Palaces, (Boston: Little, Brown, 1975).
 Tifft, Susan E., "Out of the Shadows: After decades of obscurity, African-American architect Julian Abele is finally getting recognition for his contributions to some of 20th-century America's most prestigious buildings", Smithsonian Magazine, February 2005.
 Wilson, Dreck Spurlock, African American Architects: A Biographical Dictionary, 1865-1945, (London: Routledge-Taylor & Francis Books, 2004).
 Wilson, Dreck Spurlock, "Julian Abele, Architect and the Beaux Arts", (London: Routledge-Taylor & Francis Books, 2019).

External links 

Abele, Julian (1881 - 1950) — "Philadelphia Architects and Buildings" biography.
Julian Abele: Hidden in the Shadows  — Duke University Historical Note, University Archives.
Julian Abele — at the Pennsylvania Museum School of Industrial Art.
The Winterthur Library  — Overview of an archival collection featuring Julian Abele.
Julian Abele, Architect and the Beaux Arts  — Information on architect Julian Abele, including Building and Artwork Galleries.

1881 births
1950 deaths
Architects from Philadelphia
Burials at Eden Cemetery (Collingdale, Pennsylvania)
Duke University people
Cheyney University of Pennsylvania alumni
University of Pennsylvania School of Design alumni
University of the Arts (Philadelphia) alumni
Pennsylvania Academy of the Fine Arts alumni
African-American architects
20th-century American architects
20th-century African-American artists